Andrea Thürig (born 12 March 1978) is a road cyclist from Switzerland. She represented her nation at the 2008 UCI Road World Championships.

References

External links
 profile at Procyclingstats.com

1978 births
Swiss female cyclists
Living people
Place of birth missing (living people)